
This is a list of aircraft in alphabetical order beginning with 'S'.

Sw

S-Wing
(S-Wing VSLX R.O.)
 S-Wing Swing

Swallow 
(Swallow Aeroplane Company)
Swallow Aeroplane Company Swallow A
Swallow Aeroplane Company Swallow B

Swallow 
(Swallow Airplane Co, Wichita, KS)
 Swallow C Coupe
 Swallow C-165
 Swallow F-28-AX
 Swallow G-29
 Swallow H
 Swallow HA Sport
 Swallow HC Sport
 Swallow HW Sport
 Swallow Hisso Swallow
 Swallow J4 Swallow
 Swallow J5 Swallow
 Swallow Mailplane
 Swallow Monoplane Dallas Spirit
 Swallow New Swallow
 Swallow OX-5 Swallow
 Swallow Racer Miss Wichita
 Swallow Super Swallow
 Swallow T-29
 Swallow TP
 Swallow Dallas Spirit
 Swallow Dole Racer Dallas Spirit

Swan 
(William G Swan, Atlantic City, NJ)
 Swan 1931 Monoplane

Swanson 
(1917: Swen Swanson, Williamsburg, VA 1922: Univ of South Dakota, Vermillion, SD 1925: Swanson-(Edgar) Freeman, Vermillion, SD 1931: Rockford IL. Swanson Aircraft Co Inc, Hopewell, VA 1934: Swanson-(Olaf "Ole") Fahlin, at Nicholas-Beazley Airplane Co, Marshall, MO 1935: Fahlin Mfg Co (propellers).)
 Swanson 1917 Monoplane (retroactively SS-1?)
 Swanson 1919 Biplane (retroactively SS-2?)
 Swanson SS-3
 Swanson SS-4
 Swanson W-15 Coupe
 Swanson-Fahlin SF-1
 Swanson-Fahlin SF-2 (a.k.a. Fahlin Plymocoupe after Swansons death)
 Swanson-Freeman SF-4

Swanson 
(Darwin F Swanson, Murray, IA)
 Swanson B-4-T
 Swanson C-O-2

Swanson 
(Carl Swanson, Zion IL.)
 Swanson Flyabout A-12

Swearingen 
((Ed) Swearingen Aircraft, San Antonio, TX)
 Swearingen Excalibur
 Swearingen Merlin I
 Swearingen SA26-T Merlin II
 Swearingen SA226-T Merlin III
 Swearingen Merlin IV
 Swearingen Merlin 300
 Swearingen Metro
 Swearingen SA226-TC Metro II
 Swearingen SA227-AC Metro III
 Swearingen SA227-AT Metro IV
 Swearingen Metro 23
 Swearingen SA-30
 Swearingen-Jaffe SJ30
 Swearingen-Jaffe SJ30-2
 Swearingen SA-32T Turbo Trainer
 Swearingen SX-300
 Swearingen Taurus

Swedish Aerosport
(Spanga, Sweden)
Swedish Aerosport Mosquito

Swift 
(Swift Aircraft Corp (pres: W R Ritchey), 3301 S Oliver, Wichita, KS)
 Swift 18
 Swift 19
 Swift Special
 Swift Sport
 Swift Trainer

Swift Aircraft 
(Swift Aircraft, Norwich, Norkolk, United Kingdom)
 Swift II
 Swift VLA

Swing-Europe
(Ebringen, Germany)
Swing-Europe Parashell

Swing Flugsportgeräte
(Landsberied, Germany)
Swing Apus
Swing Arcus
Swing Astral
Swing Axis
Swing Brave
Swing Cirrus
Swing Connect
Swing Core
Swing Discus
Swing Hybrid
Swing Mirage
Swing Mistral
Swing Mito
Swing Naja
Swing Nexus
Swing Nyos
Swing Scorpio
Swing Sensis
Swing Spitfire
Swing Sting
Swing Stratus
Swing Trinity
Swing Tusker
Swing Twin

Swiss Excellence Airplanes 
(Switzerland)
 Swiss Excellence Risen
 Swiss Excellence Siren

References

Further reading

External links

 List Of Aircraft (S)

de:Liste von Flugzeugtypen/N–S
fr:Liste des aéronefs (N-S)
nl:Lijst van vliegtuigtypes (N-S)
pt:Anexo:Lista de aviões (N-S)
ru:Список самолётов (N-S)
sv:Lista över flygplan/N-S
vi:Danh sách máy bay (N-S)